The 1988 Swish Scottish Professional Championship was a professional non-ranking snooker tournament, which took place between 11 and 14 February 1988 at Marco's Leisure Centre in Edinburgh, Scotland.

Stephen Hendry won the title for the third time in a row by beating Murdo MacLeod 10–4 in the final.

Main draw

References

Scottish Professional Championship
Scottish Professional Championship
Scottish Professional Championship
Scottish Professional Championship
Sports competitions in Edinburgh